The People's National Movement (PNM) is the longest-serving and oldest active political party in Trinidad and Tobago. The party has dominated national and local politics for much of Trinidad and Tobago's history, contesting all elections since 1956 serving as the nation's governing party or on four occasions, the main opposition. As a result, it has sometimes been referred to as Trinidad and Tobago's "main political party". There have been four PNM Prime Ministers and multiple ministries. The party espouses the principles of liberalism and generally sits at the centre to centre-left of the political spectrum.

The party was founded in 1955 by Eric Williams, who took inspiration from Norman Manley's democratic socialist centre-left People's National Party in Jamaica. It won the 1956 General Elections and went on to hold power for an unbroken 30 years. After the death of Williams in 1981, George Chambers led the party. The party was defeated in the 1986 General Elections, losing 33–3 to the National Alliance for Reconstruction (NAR). Under the leadership of Patrick Manning, the party returned to power in 1991 following the 1990 attempted coup by the Jamaat al-Muslimeen, but lost power in 1995 to the United National Congress (UNC). The PNM lost again to the UNC in the 2000 General Elections, but a split in the UNC forced new elections in 2001. These elections resulted in an 18–18 tie between the PNM and the UNC, and President Arthur N. R. Robinson appointed Manning as Prime Minister. Manning was unable to elect a Speaker of the House of Representatives, but won an outright majority in new elections held in 2002 and again in 2007, before losing power in 2010. It returned to power in the 2015 general election under Keith Rowley where it had its best result since the 1981 general election, winning 51.7 percent of the popular vote and 23 of the 41 seats. In the 2020 general election, they won the popular vote and a majority in the House of Representatives, winning 22 seats.

The party symbol is the balisier flower (Heliconia bihai) and the Party's political headquarters is known as the "Balisier House" located in Port of Spain. Historically, the PNM has been supported by a majority of Afro-Trinidadians and Tobagonians and the Creole-Mulatto population, thus it is colloquially called the Black Party, the African Party, or the Creole Party. The PNM has its strongest support in cities and urban areas. It was also historically supported by different minorities such as the Chinese, Christian Indians (other than Presbyterian Indians), and Muslims of any ethnicity of the country.

The PNM's signature policies and legislative decisions include independence, writing the Constitution of Trinidad and Tobago, republicanism, the establishment of the Tobago House of Assembly, the Public Transport Service Corporation, the Water Taxi Service, universal preschool, primary and secondary education, universal health care, criminalizing child marriage and decriminalizing cannabis. In government since the 2015 general election, the party holds an overall majority of 22 out of 41 Members of Parliament in the House of Representatives and 16 out of 31 members of the Senate. The party has 72 out of the 139 local councillors and is in control of seven of the 14 regional corporations since the 2019 Trinidadian local elections. The party also has one out of 12 assembly members in the Tobago House of Assembly since the December 2021 Tobago House of Assembly elections.

Despite not being a socialist party, the PNM was a member of the democratic socialist West Indies Federal Labour Party in the Federal Parliament of the West Indies Federation from 1957 to 1962. The party includes a semi-autonomous Tobagonian branch known as the Tobago Council of the People's National Movement. As of September 2018, the PNM has 100,000+ registered members.

Rise to power 

When Eric Williams returned to Trinidad in 1948 he set about developing a political base. Between 1948 and 1955 he delivered a series of political lectures, under the auspices of the Political Education Movement (PEM) a branch of the Teachers Education and Cultural Association. Naparima College is one of the locations at which such lectures were delivered. On 15 January 1956 Williams launched the PNM. In the 1956 General Elections the PNM captured 13 of the 24 elected seats in the Legislative Council with 38.7% of the votes cast. In order to secure an outright majority in the Legislative Council Williams managed to convince the Secretary of State for the Colonies to allow him to name the five appointed members of the council (despite the opposition of the Governor Sir Edward Betham Beetham). This gave him a clear majority in the Legislative Council. Williams was thus elected Chief Minister and was also able to get all seven of his ministers elected.

In the 1958 Federal Elections (which the PNM contested as part of the West Indies Federal Labour Party), it won four of the 10 Trinidad and Tobago seats with 47.4% of the vote. The Opposition, Democratic Labour Party won the other six seats.

Independence era 
In the 1961 General Elections the PNM won 20 of 30 seats with 58% of the vote. With the collapse of the West Indian Federation the PNM led Trinidad and Tobago to independence on 31 August 1962.

In the 1966 General Elections the PNM won 24 of 36 seats with 52% of the vote. However economic and social discontent grew under PNM rule. This came to a climax in April 1970 with the Black Power Revolution. On 13 April, PNM Deputy Leader and Minister of External Affairs A.N.R. Robinson resigned from the party and government. On the 20th facing a revolt by a portion of the Army in collusion with the growing Black Power movement, Williams declared a State of Emergency. By 22 April the mutineers had begun negotiations for surrender. Following this certain ministers were forced to resign including John O'Halloran, Minister of Industry and Gerard Montano, Minister of Home Affairs.

In the 1971 General Elections the PNM faced only limited opposition as the major opposition parties boycotted the election citing the use of voting machines. The PNM captured all 36 seats in the election, including eight that they carried unopposed. Additionally Williams split the post of Deputy Leader into three and appointed Kamaluddin Mohammed, Errol Mahabir and George Chambers to the position.

In 1972 J. R. F. Richardson crossed the floor and declared himself an Independent. He was subsequently appointed Leader of the Opposition. He was soon joined by another MP, Dr. Horace Charles.

In 1973 the PNM faced a major crisis. On 28 September Williams announced that he would not stand for re-election. This led to a race to succeed him as Political Leader of the party. By 18 November 250 of 476 registered party groups had submitted nominations, 224 of them for Attorney General Karl Hudson-Phillips and 26 for Minister of Health, Kamaluddin Mohammed. Williams announced on 2 December that he would return as Political Leader and Hudson-Phillips was forced out of the party.

Decline and fall 
In 1976 the PNM won 24 of 36 seats with 54% of the vote. In March 1978 Hector McClean, Minister of Works, resigned from the party and government and declared himself an independent MP.

On 29 March 1981 Eric Williams died. Williams had maintained an iron grip over the party and forced all potential rivals out of the party. In the absence of a clear successor, President Ellis Clarke was left to choose the new Prime Minister from among the three Deputy Political Leaders of the party. Clarke appointed George Chambers Prime Minister in preference to Kamaluddin Mohammed and Errol Mahabir. Chambers was subsequently elected as Political Leader of the PNM and led the party to victory in the 1981 General Elections. The PNM won 26 of 36 seats and 52% of the vote.

It subsequently held on to power until 1986 when it was defeated by the National Alliance for Reconstruction (NAR) under the leadership of A.N.R. Robinson. The PNM won three of 36 seats with 32% of the vote. Chambers resigned and was succeeded by Patrick Manning as Political Leader.

Manning and the PNM re-invented 

When Manning became leader he promised a "new PNM" and purposely ignored the discredited old guard. He appointed Wendell Mottley, Keith Rowley and Augustus Ramrekersingh as his deputy leaders.

The PNM was returned to power in the 1991 elections after the NAR self-destructed. In the 1991 election it won 21 of 36 seats with 45% of the vote. However, in the latter half of that term the party became unstable. It lost one seat in a by-election and another when Ralph Maraj defected to the United National Congress. The issue that led Maraj to defect was the declaration of a limited State of Emergency which sole purpose was to remove Occah Seepaul (Maraj's sister) as Speaker of the House of Representatives. The party also suffered a loss of support with the death Minister of Public Utilities, Morris Marshall, a favourite of the party grassroots. Attempting to halt the decline in party support Manning called an early "snap election" in 1995 . Many party front-benchers did not seek reelection including Finance Minister Wendell Mottley.

The party lost the 1995 General Elections winning 17 of 36 seats with 48% of the vote. The United National Congress (UNC) under the leadership of Basdeo Panday also won 17 seats and formed a coalition government with the National Alliance for Reconstruction which had won the remaining two seats. The PNM was further weakened when two MPs resigned from the party and threw their support behind the UNC government. This led to numerous calls for Manning to resign the party leadership, and for calls for Mottley to replace him. Manning declined to resign and Mottley appeared to have taken a sabbatical from politics. When leadership elections were held in 1997 Manning was challenged by Keith Rowley. Manning was returned as Political Leader.

In 2000 the PNM suffered another defeat, winning 16 of 36 seats with 46% of the vote. Another election was held in 2001 which resulted in a tie with both the PNM and UNC winning 18 seats, the PNM with 46% of the electoral vote and the UNC with 50%. However President Arthur N.R. Robinson appointed Manning as Prime Minister on the basis of "moral and spiritual grounds". (In Trinidad and Tobago's elections, the number of seats needed to occupy the lower house is really the best indicator of whether or not a party would win elections). Unable to elect a Speaker, Manning advised the President to prorogue Parliament. On 7 October 2002 General Elections were held in which the PNM won 50.7% of popular votes and 20 out of 36 seats.

In government since 2015 

On 9 September 2015, Keith Rowley was sworn in as the new Prime Minister, following the election victory of the PNM.
In August 2020, the governing PNM won the following general election, leading to the incumbent Prime Minister Keith Rowley serving a second term.

Leaders of the People's National Movement
The political leaders of the People's National Movement have been as follows (any acting leaders indicated in italics):

Key:

PM: Prime Minister
LO: Leader of the Opposition
†: Died in office

Deputy leaders of the People's National Movement
The deputy political leaders of the People's National Movement have been as follows (any acting leaders indicated in italics):

Tobago Council leaders 

The deputy political leaders who additionally served as the political leaders of the Tobago Council of the People's National Movement have been as follows (any acting leaders indicated in italics):

Key:

MaL: Majority Leader
MiL: Minority Leader

PNM Leadership Executive Committee

Youth Arm

Women's Arm

Tobago Council of the People's National Movement 

Tobago has its own PNM party with separate memberships, constituency associations, executives, offices and a political leader.

Electoral history

House of Representatives

West Indies

Corporations

Tobago House of Assembly

See also

 2022 People's National Movement leadership election
2020 Tobago Council of the People's National Movement leadership election

References

External links
 
 PNM Website (Archive)
 Vision PNM 
 PNM Abroad

1955 establishments in the British Empire
Liberal parties in North America
Political parties established in 1955
Political parties in Trinidad and Tobago
Social liberal parties
Non-interventionist parties